Gopal Prasad Rimal (1975–2030) was a Nepalese poet from Kathmandu, Nepal. According to scholar Michael J. Hutt, "he is remembered as the first "revolutionary" Nepali poet and the first to reject the use of meter".

Biography and career 
His parents were Umakanta Rimal and Aditya Kumari Rimal. His first poem, entitled "Kavi ko Gayan" was published in a monthly magazine called Sharada.

During Rimal's adolescence, he came under the influence of revolutionaries who were aspiring to overthrow the Rana dynasty. Rimal began his career as a successful poet in 1930 and as a playwright in 1940. In 1941, after the execution of a group of political agitators, including Dashrath Chand, Rimal gathered a group of young poets to protest together by singing hymns, at Pashupatinath Temple in the mornings, and at the shrine of Shobhā Bhagavatī in the evenings.

Rimal founded a creative organization called "Praja Panchayat" to oppose the Rana rulers and was imprisoned on several occasions for his involvement in the movement.  He played a pivotal role in making the 1950–52 Democratic Movement successful, but became disillusioned, and "felt betrayed by the factional strife."

Father= Uma kanta Rimal 

His dreams of a democratic Nepal shattered, Rimal subsequently lost his mental balance and was sent to an asylum in Ranchi. Later, he was brought back to Nepal to spend the rest of his life roaming insane in the streets of Kathmandu. Rimal died in 1973.

"Jangi Nishan Hamro"
Jangi Nishan Hamro or Rato Ra Chandra Surya is one of the most famous poem of Rimal.

Awards 
Rimal received the Madan Puraskar in 1962. for his collection of poems 'Aama ko sapana'. He also awarded with the Tribhuwan Pragya Puraskar in 1973 A.D.

Works 
Gopal Prasad Rimal's "Aama ko sapana" literally 'Mother's Dream' is a popular poem in Nepal.

Influence 
Poet Banira Giri was "first woman to be awarded a Ph.D. by Tribhuvan University for her thesis on the poetry of Gopal Prasad Rimal."

See also
List of Nepalese poets

References

External links
 Collected Poems Of Gopal Prasad Rimal, in "Nepali Poems", compiled by Sanjaal Corps

Nepalese male poets
Nepalese dramatists and playwrights
Nepalese prisoners and detainees
Nepalese activists
Prisoners and detainees of Nepal
1917 births
1973 deaths
People from Kathmandu
Madan Puraskar winners
20th-century Nepalese poets
20th-century dramatists and playwrights
20th-century male writers